The 1957–58 IHL season was the 13th season of the International Hockey League, a North American minor professional league. Outside of the Louisville Rebels, who relocated from Huntington, the league's teams all remained intact from the previous season. 

The season saw the dominant Cincinnati Mohawks win their sixth-straight regular season title only to be upset in the Turner Cup semifinals by Louisville. The playoff loss denied the Mohawks their sixth-straight Turner Cup championship. Meanwhile, in the Turner Cup Finals, the Indianapolis Chiefs defeated the Louisville Rebels 4-games-to-3 in a tight series. Both teams had less wins in the regular season then losses.

Regular season

Turner Cup-Playoffs

Turner Cup playoffs

Semifinals
Louisville Rebels 3, Cincinnati Mohawks 1

Indianapolis Chiefs 3, Fort Wayne Komets 1

Turner Cup Finals
Indianapolis Chiefs 4, Louisville Rebels 3

Awards

Coaches
Cincinnati Mohawks: Billy Goold
Fort Wayne Komets: Eddie Olson
Indianapolis Chiefs: Leo Lamoureux
Louisville Rebels: Leo Gasparini
Toledo Mercurys: Doug Balwin
Troy Bruins: Jim Hay

References

Attendance Figures - Cincinnati Enquirer 03-17-1958 through 03-22-1958

External links
 Season 1957/58 on hockeydb.com

IHL
International Hockey League (1945–2001) seasons